Forest Hills is an unincorporated community and census-designated place (CDP) in Kent County in the U.S. state of Michigan.   The population was 25,867 at the 2010 census.

Forest Hills is the most-populated CDP and also the largest by area in the state of Michigan.  The CDP encompasses nearly all of Ada Township and most of the northern half of Cascade Township.  The Forest Hills Public Schools District serves most of the community.

Geography

The Grand River crosses the community from the east side to the northwest corner.

Major highways
 forms portions of the southernmost boundary of the community. 
 runs west and ends at I-96 at the southwestern corner of the community but does not run through the community.
 runs east–west though the center of the community.

Demographics

As of the census of 2000, there were 20,942 people, 7,105 households, and 6,046 families residing in the community. The racial makeup of the community was 95.28% White, 0.64% African American, 0.20% Native American, 2.63% Asian, 0.34% from other races, and 0.91% from two or more races. Hispanic or Latino of any race were 0.95% of the population.

There were 7,105 households, out of which 44.2% had children under the age of 18 living with them, 78.6% were married couples living together, 4.8% had a female householder with no husband present, and 14.9% were non-families. 12.7% of all households were made up of individuals, and 4.9% had someone living alone who was 65 years of age or older.  The average household size was 2.94 and the average family size was 3.23.

In the community, the population was spread out, with 31.4% under the age of 18, 4.9% from 18 to 24, 25.6% from 25 to 44, 29.4% from 45 to 64, and 8.8% who were 65 years of age or older.  The median age was 39 years. For every 100 females, there were 99.3 males.  For every 100 females age 18 and over, there were 96.1 males.

The median income for a household in the community was $96,150 (2007 estimate), and the median income for a family was $106,521. Males had a median income of $68,003 versus $37,553 for females. The per capita income for the community was $39,517.  About 1.3% of families and 2.0% of the population were below the poverty line, including 1.7% of those under age 18 and 3.9% of those age 65 or over.

References

Unincorporated communities in Kent County, Michigan
Census-designated places in Michigan
Grand Rapids metropolitan area
Unincorporated communities in Michigan
Census-designated places in Kent County, Michigan